Jorge Francisco Sotomayor Chávez (born 5 February 1980) is a Mexican independent politician formerly affiliated with the PAN. As of 2013 he served as Deputy of the LXII Legislature of the Mexican Congress representing the Federal District.

References

1980 births
Living people
Politicians from Mexico City
National Action Party (Mexico) politicians
21st-century Mexican politicians
Panamerican University alumni
Deputies of the LXII Legislature of Mexico
Members of the Chamber of Deputies (Mexico) for Mexico City